IFAC Member Bodies and Associates are accounting organizations that are members of the International Federation of Accountants (IFAC) or that are associated with IFAC.

IFAC members are:

See also
International Federation of Francophone Accountants

References

Member bodies of the International Federation of Accountants
Accounting organizations